Dinas Rock (Welsh: Craig y Ddinas, "Fortress Rock") is a high promontory of Carboniferous Limestone which rises between the Afon Mellte and its left-bank tributary, the Afon Sychryd on the border between the county of Powys and the county borough of Neath Port Talbot in south Wales. It can be found near the village of Pontneddfechan near Glyn Neath at the head of the Vale of Neath. It derives its name from the presence of Iron Age earthworks on its summit, dinas in Welsh signifying a defensive site or "city".

Protected landscape and habitats
Dinas Rock lies within the Brecon Beacons National Park and the Fforest Fawr Geopark. It is owned by Natural Resources Wales, who manage it for its wildlife interest and recreation. The mineral rights (and thus relicts of former mining and quarrying) are owned by Natural Amenities Ltd, a body concerned with the preservation of mines. The deep gorges which define its northern and southern edges are designated as a part of the Coedydd Nedd a Mellte (Neath & Mellte Woodlands) Special Area of Conservation (SAC) on account of their thick oak and ash woodlands, which shelter important bryophyte communities, in particular certain species of moss. The woodlands are also designated as a part of the Dyffrynoedd Nedd a Mellte a Moel Penderyn (Neath & Mellte Valleys and Moel Penderyn) Site of Special Scientific Interest.

Industrial archaeology
The landform has been re-shaped by the extraction of limestone and by the nearby mining of silica rock and its transport down-valley by various means. The former limestone quarry is now a car park; its walls are used by climbers and abseilers. The Dinas Rock Silica Mines just to the east of Dinas Rock itself used to provide large quantities of very pure crushed sandstone destined for the manufacture of refractory bricks for furnace linings and the like. A system of tramways, aerial cableways and inclines on the southern flanks of Dinas Rock conveyed the material from the mines to the valley below.

Recreation

Its dramatic appearance has long made Dinas Rock a destination for casual visitors, but its steep rocky flanks also attract rock climbers and gorge-walkers. The tramways now provide routes for walkers to enjoy the site, in particular the Sychryd easy-access trail, which runs for ¼ mile from the main car park to the Sgydau Sychryd cascade between Dinas Rock and the spectacular rock known as Bwa Maen, on the southern side of the Afon Sychryd.

Climbing
The steep and overhanging southern faces of Dinas Rock are moderately popular with sports climbers, whilst easier routes are enjoyed by organised groups in the former quarry at the western end of the rock. It is considered by some as the best inland cliff in South Wales for rock climbing. The cliff features 75 sports routes through a variety of grades on clean rock with a variety of styles and features.

Gorge walking
The beds and rocky sides of the two rivers provide one of the most popular venues in Wales for gorge-walkers. Natural Resources Wales (NRW) works with organised adventure sports providers and landowners to manage this activity, so as to minimise the damage which it can cause to the SAC, which NRW is charged with protecting under European environmental protection law.

Caving
There are a few short caves in and around Dinas Rock, including Ogof Pont Sychryd, Ogof Bwa Maen and Will's Hole. The last named is also known as Arthur's Cave or Dinas Rock Cave and extends to just under  in length. It is associated with Arthurian legend, as it is one of the many locations reputed to be the place where Arthur's knights lie waiting for a call to defend Britain.

Motorcycle Sport
The International Six Days Trial was first held in 1913 in Carlisle. The event originally a reliability test became the premiere off road event sometimes known as the Olympics or Davis Cup of Motorcycling and was reported on across the world and in News Reels and National Daily Papers. It took place in Wales in 1933, 1937, 1938, and 1949 starting from Llandrindod Wells. Each day the riders faced about 400 km of riding. In these years the course passes and featured Dinas Rock as a technical challenging feature. It was sufficiently noted for the specialist press photographers to catch the riders passing through and images of Dinas Rock are found in the motorcycle magazine reports of the time.

References

External links
Speedtracktales: the History of the ISDT
Climb High:Dinas Rock

Cliffs of Powys
Cliffs of Rhondda Cynon Taf
Fforest Fawr
Vale of Neath
Climbing areas of Wales